Land of Leather was a furniture retail store based in Northfleet, Kent in the United Kingdom. It operated in the United Kingdom and Ireland.

The company was hit hard by the downward slope in the United Kingdom's housing market which was brought about by the decline in demand, due to a lesser number of people buying and moving homes.

History 

Land of Leather was founded in 1997, and in July 2005, the company was floated on the London Stock Exchange, with the assistance of the investment bank, Investec, using the symbol LAN. In December 2008, the company employed 850 people in its 109 stores in the United Kingdom and Ireland. In January 2009, Land of Leather issued profit warnings, and was planning to raise £15 million through a new share issue.

In December 2008, Land of Leather's announcement that they were in buyout talks with a number of interested parties, caused their share price to rise by 38.5%. However, these talks ended later in December citing "insufficient value for shareholders".

Administration 
On 12 January 2009, Land of Leather Holdings plc announced that they had entered administration. Lee Manning and Nick Edwards of Deloitte were appointed as joint administrators. The company was debt free, but it was unable to secure additional funds.

The company cited reduced consumer spending and the state of the banking market at the time as the causes. The administrators are aiming to sell the company as a going concern. On 26 January 2009, it was announced that 33 stores would close, leaving 76 stores.

Soon after, the remaining Land of Leather stores closed down, and the company ceased trading in the beginning of 2009.

"Toxic sofa" lawsuit
Land of Leather sold Linkwise sofas made in China, which contained sachets of the mould-inhibiting chemical DMF. This caused serious rashes to more than 300 users, due to an allergic reaction. Land of Leather had an insurance policy with Zurich Financial Services, but the insurer refused to pay out, claiming that Land of Leather had breached policy terms.

This position was accepted on 18 March 2010, by the High Court of England and Wales, and purchasers will not be indemnified by the insurer.

References

Furniture retailers of the United Kingdom
Retail companies established in 1997
Retail companies disestablished in 2009
Companies formerly listed on the London Stock Exchange
Companies based in Kent
Defunct retail companies of the United Kingdom
Retail companies of the Republic of Ireland
Companies that have entered administration in the United Kingdom
1997 establishments in the United Kingdom
2009 disestablishments in the United Kingdom